Gallovij (also Romanized as Gallovīj, Galavīj, Galovīj, and Golavīj) is a village in Sarab Rural District, in the Central District of Sonqor County, Kermanshah Province, Iran. At the 2006 census, its population was 175, in 48 families.

References 

Populated places in Sonqor County